Dotemu SAS (originally DotEmu SAS) is a French video game developer and publisher based in the 9th arrondissement of Paris, founded in 2007 by Xavier Liard and Romain Tisserand.

History 
Dotemu was founded by Xavier Liard and Romain Tisserand in 2007. The company's offices are located in Paris, close to the Folies Bergère.

In April 2010, Dotemu launched a new digital distribution service that would sell games without digital rights management, akin to Good Old Games. In March 2017, Dotemu announced that their online store would be closed down on 1 June that year. The company cited a too strong market competition and their focus shifting towards game development rather than game distribution.

In September 2015, Liard and Tisserand sold their company to an unnamed, private investor. Later that month, they founded a new video game publisher, Playdigious. Subsequently, in October 2014, Cyrille Imbert was appointed as Dotemu's chief executive officer. In March 2018, Dotemu announced the creation of The Arcade Crew, a publishing label that would support small development teams. 

Games developed or published

References

External links 
 

Focus Entertainment
French companies established in 2007
Video game companies established in 2007
Video game companies of France
Video game development companies
Video game publishers
Companies based in Paris
2021 mergers and acquisitions